Mathieu Darche (born November 26, 1976) is a Canadian former professional ice hockey player who played for several AHL and NHL clubs. Mathieu is the younger brother of long snapper J. P. Darche. After attending the New Jersey Devils training camp in January 2013, he was asked to stay with the team but ultimately chose to retire.

Hockey career

Amateur
Darche played hockey at Choate Rosemary Hall and graduated in 1996. He has a commerce degree in marketing and international business from McGill University. While attending university, Darche played four seasons of Canadian Interuniversity Sport (CIS) hockey, where in his last year, he was named the CIS Outstanding student-athlete and was awarded the Dr. Randy Gregg Award.

Professional
During the 2004–05 NHL lockout, Darche spent a full season with the Hershey Bears of the AHL.

He played for the Füchse Duisburg of the Deutsche Eishockey Liga (DEL) in 2005–06 and also split four seasons between the NHL and AHL with the Columbus Blue Jackets, Nashville Predators, and their affiliates. In 2006–07, he played a few games with the San Jose Sharks of the NHL but spent most of the season playing for the team's AHL affiliate, the Worcester Sharks. In 2007–08, Darche played with the Tampa Bay Lightning.

After starting the 2009–10 season playing for its AHL affiliate, the Hamilton Bulldogs he was recalled and played his first game as a Canadien on January 20, 2010, versus the St. Louis Blues and scored his first goal for the team on January 22 versus the New Jersey Devils, which was a game-winning goal.

Managerial
Darche served as Vice-President of Sales and Marketing in Canada for Delmar International Inc.  before becoming the Director of Hockey Operations for the Tampa Bay Lightning on May 6, 2019.

Career statistics

References

External links

1976 births
Living people
Choate Rosemary Hall alumni
Columbus Blue Jackets players
Füchse Duisburg players
Hamilton Bulldogs (AHL) players
Hershey Bears players
Ice hockey people from Montreal
McGill Redmen ice hockey players
Milwaukee Admirals players
Montreal Canadiens players
Nashville Predators players
Norfolk Admirals players
People from Saint-Laurent, Quebec
Portland Pirates players
San Jose Sharks players
Syracuse Crunch players
Tampa Bay Lightning players
Undrafted National Hockey League players
Worcester Sharks players
Canadian ice hockey left wingers